The Midnight Ghost (Spanish:El fantasma de medianoche) is a 1940 Mexican mystery film directed by Raphael J. Sevilla and starring Victorio Blanco, Sergio de Karlo and Carlos López Moctezuma.

Cast
 Victorio Blanco 
 Sergio de Karlo 
 Carlos López Moctezuma 
 Emma Roldán 
 Natalia Ortiz
 Miguel Weimer 
 Crox Alvarado 
 Ricardo Mondragon 
 Amalia Ferriz 
 Victorio Blanco
 Manuel Sánchez Navarro 
 Parkey Hussain 
 Humberto Rodríguez

References

Bibliography 
  José de Paco Navarro. José Crespo: memorias de un actor. Editora Regional de Murcia, 1994.

External links 
 

1940 films
1940 horror films
1940 mystery films
Mexican ghost films
Mexican mystery films
1940s Spanish-language films
Films directed by Raphael J. Sevilla
Mexican black-and-white films
1940s Mexican films